James Laurence Quigley (January 27, 1896 - November 26, 1964) served in the California State Assembly for the 24th district. During World War I he served in the United States Army.

References

United States Army personnel of World War I
Republican Party members of the California State Assembly
1896 births
1964 deaths